Austral Líneas Aéreas Flight 901 was a scheduled passenger flight that crashed in a river near Buenos Aires, Argentina on May 7, 1981, after flying into a thunderstorm. All 31 people on the BAC 1-11 were killed in the accident.

Accident sequence
Flight 901 had departed from Teniente Benjamín Matienzo International Airport in Tucumán at 9:11 a.m. on 7 May 1981, bound for Jorge Newbery Metropolitan Airport. The flight was uneventful until final approach.

The weather conditions in Buenos Aires were awful, with heavy rain and winds. At 10:42, Flight 901 was cleared to land on runway 13 of Aeroparque Jorge Newbery. Shortly before 11 a.m., the pilots made an approach intending to land, but due to the rain and wind they could not see the runway and decided to abort the landing. They then conducted a go-around and started a second approach. At the suggestion of the air traffic controller, they headed south to wait over the city of Quilmes, believing that the weather would be calmer there and that the storm would cease quickly. However, when they got closer they noticed that there was Cumulonimbus, so the pilot informed the control tower of Aeroparque that they would turn towards the river to return to Buenos Aires, where they would try a different approach. From there, the Aeroparque control tower was unable to contact the crew again.

Shortly after, the crew lost control of the plane, and it crashed into a river. All 26 passengers and 5 crew were killed.

After losing contact with Flight 901, ships from the Prefectura Naval Argentina and the Argentine Navy began to search for the plane. At 2:40 p.m., more than three hours after the accident, a Prefectura helicopter was the first to sight the aircraft's wreckage. Rescuers headed there, hoping to find survivors, but their efforts were futile. The search and recovery of bodies took several days.

The Civil Aviation Accident Investigation Board was in charge of the investigation. Only a little more than half of the plane's wreckage was removed from the water. The Flight Data Recorder (FDR) and Cockpit Voice Recorder (CVR), although intensively searched for 42 days, were never found. The JIAAC investigation, due to the lack of the black boxes, could not determine with certainty the cause of the accident, although it concluded as probable cause the "loss of control of the aircraft and impact against the water due to an error of appreciation of the pilot when evaluating the meteorological conditions when crossing through the zone of influence of a cumulonimbus of extremely violent activity".

Investigation
Investigations were hampered by the fact that only 55-65% of wreckage was recovered. Even after 42 days of searching, the cockpit voice recorder and flight data recorder were not recovered. The final investigators' report blamed the pilots for underestimating the intensity of the storm.

See also 

 Communication Protocol between Tower and Flight 901

References

Accidents and incidents involving the BAC One-Eleven
Aviation accidents and incidents in 1981
Airliner accidents and incidents caused by weather
Aviation accidents and incidents in Argentina
1981 in Argentina
1981 meteorology
May 1981 events in South America
1981 disasters in Argentina